= Apollon FC =

Apollon may refer to:

- Apollon Smyrnis
- Apollon Kalamarias
- Apollon Limassol
